Issa Cissokho (born 23 February 1985) is a Senegalese professional footballer who plays as a right back. He is the older brother of former Aston Villa and French international defender Aly Cissokho.

Career 
Cissokho began his career playing for Louhans-Cuiseaux and made his professional debut with the club at the age of 17 in the 2002–03 Championnat National season. After the season, he signed with Guingamp and spent his entire career at the club playing on its reserve team. After two years playing for amateurs clubs Orléans and Blois, respectively, Cissokho joined Carquefou in the Championnat de France amateur 2, the fifth level of French football. In his first season at the club, he helped the team achieve promotion to the Championnat de France amateur.

After another season with Carquefou, in June 2010, Cissokho signed an amateur contract with professional club Nantes. After spending the majority of the 2010–11 season playing on the club's reserve team, in April 2011, Cissokho was called up to the senior team and made his club debut on 15 April in a league match against Dijon. In the following match, he scored his first professional goal in a 2–2 draw with Nîmes.

In October 2018 he signed for Maccabi Petah Tikva. He left the club at the end of the contract, and was without a club until returning to France with SO Cholet in January 2020. After making five appearances, he was released at the end of the season.

References

External links 
 
 
 

1985 births
Living people
French sportspeople of Senegalese descent
Citizens of Senegal through descent
Footballers from Paris
Association football defenders
Senegal international footballers
Senegalese footballers
Senegalese expatriate footballers
USJA Carquefou players
Blois Football 41 players
Louhans-Cuiseaux FC players
FC Nantes players
En Avant Guingamp players
US Orléans players
Genoa C.F.C. players
S.S.C. Bari players
Angers SCO players
Amiens SC players
Maccabi Petah Tikva F.C. players
SO Cholet players
Ligue 1 players
Ligue 2 players
Championnat National players
Championnat National 3 players
Israeli Premier League players
Senegalese expatriate sportspeople in Italy
Senegalese expatriate sportspeople in Israel
Expatriate footballers in Italy
Expatriate footballers in Israel